Catageus is a genus of amblypygids of the family Charontidae.

Species
, there are 8 species in this genus.

 Catageus berkeleyi (Graveley, 1915)
 Catageus brevispina (Weygoldt, 2002)
 Catageus cavernicola (Thorell, 1889)
 Catageus cerberus (Simon, 1901)
 Catageus dammermani (Roewer, 1928)
 Catageus longispina (Gravely, 1915)
 Catageus orientalis (Seiter & Wolf, 2017)
 Catageus sunda (Rahmadi & Harvey, 2008)

References 

Amblypygi
Arachnid genera